Emese Mózes-Rácz (born 16 March 1983 in Debrecen) is a former Hungarian handballer. She retired from professional handball in 2011, when she gave birth to her first child. Alongside with her family, she moved to Twyford, Berkshire, United Kingdom. She returned to handball on amateur level and helped a British team, the Reading Lionesses, with her experience to win the second division.

Achievements
Magyar Kupa:
Silver Medallist: 2003
Bronze Medallist: 2010
EHF Cup:
Semifinalist: 2006
Youth European Championship:
Bronze Medallist: 2003
World University Championship:
Silver Medallist: 2006

References

External links
 Emese Mózes-Rácz career statistics on Worldhandball.com
 Emese Mózes-Rácz player profile on Békéscsabai Előre NKSE Official Website

1983 births
Living people
People from Twyford, Berkshire
Sportspeople from Debrecen
Hungarian female handball players
Békéscsabai Előre NKSE players